Stanton De Burgh Welch  (born 1969) is an Australian dancer and choreographer. He currently serves as the Artistic Director of the Houston Ballet.

Early life
Welch was born in Melbourne to Marilyn Jones and Garth Welch, two prominent Australian dancers.

Career
Welch was initially trained at the dance school run by his parents. In 1989, after a year as a scholarship student at the San Francisco Ballet School, Welch was accepted into the Australian Ballet where he became a leading soloist.

While with The Australian Ballet, Welch developed an interest in choreography and, in 1990, received his first commission. By 1995, he had been appointed a resident choreographer with the Australian Ballet and, in 2003, he was also appointed artistic director of the Houston Ballet.

Welch has received choreographic commissions from many international companies including the Australian Ballet, the Houston Ballet, the American Ballet Theatre, the Atlanta Ballet, BalletMet, the Birmingham Royal Ballet, the Royal Danish Ballet, the San Francisco Ballet and the Moscow Dance Theatre.

Welch is also known for staging works for Colorado Ballet, Cincinnati Ballet, Tulsa Ballet, the Texas Ballet Theater, the Royal Ballet School, the Singapore Dance Theatre, the Royal New Zealand Ballet and Fugate/Bahiri Ballet NY.

Since 2006, Welch serves as a Jury Member for the Young America Grand Prix.

Works

The Three of Us (1990)
A Time to Dance (1990)
Of Blessed Memory (1991)
Passion and Canon (1992)
Before the Rain (1993)
Divergence (1994)
Corroboree (1995)
Madame Butterfly (1995)
Red Earth (1996)
Maninyas (1996)
Cinderella (1997)
X (1999)
Indigo (1999)
Bruiser (2000)
Fingerprints (2000)
Clear (2001)
Within You Without You: A Tribute to George Harrison (2002)
Tu Tu (2003)
Velocity (2003)
Carmina Burana (2003)
Bolero (2004)
Blindness (2004)
Tales of Texas (2004)
Falling (2005)
Nosotros (2005)
Sleeping Beauty (2005)
Swan Lake (2006)
Punctilious (2007)
A Doll's House (2008)
Mediæval Bæbes (2008)
Marie (2009)
La Bayadère (2010)
The Young Person's Guide to the Orchestra (2014)
Romeo & Juliet (2015)
Sylvia (2019)

References

External links
Page at Australian Ballet
Page at Houston ballet

1969 births
Living people
Ballet choreographers
Australian male ballet dancers
Australian Ballet soloists
Members of the Order of Australia
Stanton Welch
People from Melbourne